Robomow (also known as Friendly Robotics) is a manufacturer of robotic lawn mowers. Founded in Even Yehuda, Israel in 1995 by Udi Peless and Shai Abramson, the company provides robotic lawnmowers to the United States and Europe, with prices ranging from hundreds to thousands of dollars/Euros. Robomow mowers are rechargeable, environmentally-friendly designed to meet all safety standards. Robomow also comes with its own mobile application (the Robomow app) for remote and interactive control. The company has been mentioned in several magazines including: Design News, Business Wire, Washington Home and Garden and Vanity Fair. In May 2017, MTD Products Inc announced their intent to purchase Friendly Robotics. In July 2017, MTD Products announced the completion of the purchase of Robomow.

History

Robotic Lawn Mowers 
Robomow was originally named ‘Friendly Machines’ with the goal of constructing robots that will, as Udi Peless says in Space Daily, "move in and around the home, doing the mundane tasks that people do not like to do anymore".

The Robomow Classic model debuted in the GLEE exhibition in Birmingham, UK in 1997 and was the ‘father’ of Friendly Robotics’ official first model. This Classic model was launched for sale in 1998, selling approximately 4000 units between 1998 and 2001.

The company name was changed to Friendly Robotics in 1999.

In 2000, the second generation of robotic mowers arrived: the Robomow ‘RL’ platform. Compared to the Robomow Classic, Robomow RL was more advanced, smaller, lighter and significantly more user-friendly. Further enhancements included the Base Station, enabling users to create a periodic lawn mowing program.

In 2008, the Robomow ‘RM’ product line made its debut as the third generation of robotic lawn mowers. Smaller, lighter and an improved version of the RL line, RM was designed specifically for the smaller lawn, which up until now, had been largely ignored.

In 2011, Robomow introduced its ‘RED’ Robomow line; a younger and slightly lower cost version of the successful RL and RM models. These models were and still are sold at DIY and Consumer Electronics chains, as well as on the Internet.

2013 saw the birth of the Robomow ‘RS’ product line, the fourth generation of robotic mowers.

In 2014, Robomow introduced its fifth generation of robotic mowers: its ‘RC’ models. These mowers were designed for lawns of up to 1200 m2 and are fully programmable via the Robomow App.

Robotic Vacuum Cleaners 
In 2002, Hoover and Friendly Robotics announced a strategic alliance for developing robotic vacuum cleaners. By 2004, the first model, Friendly Vac RV400, was on the market. Weighing in at 23 pounds, it is the largest robotic cleaner of all times.
However, this line of products was discontinued, and the company now focuses only on robotic lawn mowers.

Mowing 
All current Robomow models are able to mow grass inside a specified area by staying within an underground, electrified wire. The wire is installed around the mowing area by hammering it in with pegs just below the surface. Grass soon covers the wire so that it is not visible. Where areas within the specified are not to be mowed, 'islands' can be created by keeping two strands of the electrified wire together and creating internal areas.

The mowing that Robomow does is directed in accordance with its movement algorithm, which is not straight up and down. Therefore, although no traditional mowing lines can be seen, Robomow covers the entire mowing zone within a few operations. In between mows, the mower's batteries are recharged at its docking/charging station which it returns to automatically.

Robomow models 
RC/MC: these models have a 28 cm wide blade that fit any lawn of up to 1200m2. They can be installed outside of the lawn for not interrupting with the normal use of the lawn.

RS/MS: these models have a 56 cm cutting width supported by two 28 cm blades, which are suitable for any lawn up to 3500m2.

Key Executives

References

External links 
 

Robotics companies
Lawn mower manufacturers
Domestic robots
Technology in society
Technology companies established in 1995
Manufacturing companies established in 1995
Israeli companies established in 1995
2017 mergers and acquisitions